Roy Tam Hoi-pong (born 17 May 1980) is a Hong Kong activist and politician. Known for advocating environmental activism and localism and as a former member of the Tsuen Wan District Council, Tam was charged with in 2021 with subversion in Hong Kong 47 case.

Early career 
After graduating from CNEC Christian College and from Chinese University of Hong Kong with Bachelor of Science in Environmental Science, Tam first worked as a teacher in multiple schools, teaching biology, science, and computer science. Notable students include Tommy Cheung, former spokesman of student activist group Scholarism.

Environmental activism 
Dedicated in promoting environmental awareness, Tam co-founded and was the inaugural editor-in-chief of Green Post, a campus media on environmental protection. He also founded two local environmental groups, Footprint and Green Sense, in 2002 and 2004 respectively.

Tam was often interviewed on green issues, such as on walled buildings, energy saving, urban planning. In 2009 the group advocated 50-cent charge for disposable utensils after McDonald's Skip the Straw Day programme.

However, Tam's environmental views was sometimes criticised as radical, such as recommending no escalators in metro stations and calling for boycotting World Wildlife Fund, and was branded by pundit Choy Chi-keung as "environmentalism Taliban" after Tam urged to cancel television programme Hole in the Wall for wasting Styrofoam, and by others for his objection to Ice Bucket Challenge.

Political career 

Tam ran in the 2008 legislative election in Kowloon West constituency under the slogan "vote for a green Hong Kong". He supported universal suffrage for both Chief Executive and Legislative Council elections, but claimed to be neither a democrat nor a conservative. Despite supported by Civic Party and Democratic Party's New Territories East branch chairman, he was defeated by a large margin.

Tam announced his intention to join the 2012 election, but abandoned his election plan citing illness. 

A localism supporter to reduce quota of Chinese One-way Permit, Tam in 2013, along with various pro-democracy legislator and activists, initiated the anti-assimilation, anti-communization, anti-Leung movement, urging a stop to Chinese interference in Hong Kong and the resignation of Leung Chun-ying as Chief Executive. Tam also called on Taiwan to alert growing Chinese influence. Tam is also a supporter for Taiwan independence to preserve democratic institutions and defend local culture after he described Hong Kong's One Country, Two Systems as a failure.

After being elected to the Tsuen Wan District Council in the new Ma Wan constituency in 2015, Tam again intended to run in the 2016 legislative election for the pro-democracy Neo Democrats, but withdrew to take care of his ill wife.

In 2019 amidst the large scale protest, Tam was re-elected in the District Council election in a landslide victory. Neo Democrats put Tam's name forward in the 2020 pro-democracy primaries, but was defeated with the least votes amongst the candidates.

Tam was arrested in February 2021 for "subversion of state power" for running in the primaries and detained since then after bail denied by court. The case of which would be known as "Hong Kong 47". He quit Neo Democrats and resigned from the District Council on 20 April 2021.

Electoral performances

2008 legislative election

2015 local elections

2019 local elections

References 

Hong Kong pan-democrats
Alumni of the Chinese University of Hong Kong
Neo Democrats politicians